Moo2 or variation, may refer to:

 Master of Orion II: Battle at Antares (1996 videogame) 4X turn-based strategy game
 Molybdenum dioxide (MoO2)

See also

 Moo moo (disambiguation)
 Moo (disambiguation)